Zeba Ali or Zeba Ali Sheikh is a Pakistani television actress and model. She started her career as model and has appeared in television serials including Mutthi Bhar Mitti, Husn Bay Hijab and Man-O-Salwa.

Career 
Ali started her career as a model in 2001. Her debut in television was Aaina, which aired on TV ONE. Ali is also a contestant in ARY Digital's reality show Madventures.

Filmography 
 Aaina
 Husn Bay Hijab
 Lahore Junction
 Madventures
 Man-O-Salwa
 Meri Behan Meri Devrani
 Meri Zaat Zarra-e-Benishan
 Mujhay Roothnay Na Daina
 Mutthi Bhar Mitti
 Pyari Shammo
 Tere Aaney Ke Baad
 Tum Ho Keh Chup
 Meri Behan Meri Dewrani

Awards and nominations 
 Nominee: Best Actress Drama Serial in a Supporting Role in The 1st Indus Drama Awards 2005

References

External links 
 

Living people
Actresses from Karachi
Pakistani female models
Pakistani television actresses
21st-century Pakistani actresses
Year of birth missing (living people)